Eris ("Strife") is the Greek goddess of strife and discord. Her Roman equivalent is Discordia, which means the same. Eris's Greek opposite is Harmonia, whose Roman counterpart is Concordia. Homer equated her with the war-goddess Enyo, whose Roman counterpart is Bellona. The dwarf planet Eris is named after the goddess.

She had no temples in ancient Greece and functions essentially as a personification, as which she appears in Homer and many later works.

Etymology
Eris is of uncertain etymology; connections with the verb  , 'to raise, stir, excite', and the proper name   have been suggested. R. S. P. Beekes rejects these derivations and suggested a Pre-Greek origin.

Characteristics in Greek mythology
In Hesiod's Works and Days 11–24, two different goddesses named Eris are distinguished:

So, after all, there was not one kind of Strife alone, but all over the earth there are two. As for the one, a man would praise her when he came to understand her; but the other is blameworthy: and they are wholly different in nature. For one fosters evil war and battle, being cruel: her no man loves; but perforce, through the will of the deathless gods, men pay harsh Strife her honour due.

(Nyx), and the son of Cronus  [i.e. Zeus] who sits above and dwells in the aether, set her in the roots of the earth: and she is far kinder to men. She stirs up even the shiftless to toil; for a man grows eager to work when he considers his neighbour, a rich man who hastens to plough and plant and put his house in good order; and neighbour vies with his neighbour as he hurries after wealth. This Strife is wholesome for men. And potter is angry with potter, and craftsman with craftsman and beggar is jealous of beggar, and minstrel of minstrel.

In Hesiod's Theogony (226–232), Eris, the daughter of Night, is less kindly spoken of as she brings forth other personifications as her children:

The other Eris is presumably she who appears in Homer's Iliad Book IV; equated with Enyo as sister of Ares and so presumably daughter of Zeus and Hera:

... and Discord [Ἔρις] that rageth incessantly, sister and comrade of man-slaying Ares; she at the first rears her crest but little, yet thereafter planteth her head in heaven, while her feet tread on earth. She it was that now cast evil strife into their midst as she fared through the throng, making the groanings of men to wax.

She also has a son whom she named Strife.

Enyo is mentioned in Book 5, and Zeus sends Strife to rouse the Achaeans in Book 11, of the same work.

The most famous tale of Eris recounts her initiating the Trojan War by causing the Judgement of Paris. The goddesses Hera, Athena and Aphrodite had been invited along with the rest of Olympus to the forced wedding of Peleus and Thetis, who would become the parents of Achilles, but Eris had been snubbed because of her troublemaking inclinations.

She therefore (as mentioned at the Kypria according to Proclus as part of a plan hatched by Zeus and Themis) tossed into the party the Apple of Discord, a golden apple inscribed   – "For the most beautiful one", or "To the Fairest One" – provoking the goddesses to begin quarreling about the appropriate recipient. The hapless Paris, Prince of Troy, was appointed to select the fairest by Zeus. The goddesses stripped naked to try to win Paris's decision, and also attempted to bribe him. Hera offered political power; Athena promised infinite wisdom; and Aphrodite tempted him with the most beautiful woman in the world: Helen, wife of Menelaus of Sparta. While Greek culture placed a greater emphasis on prowess and power, Paris chose to award the apple to Aphrodite, thereby dooming his city, which was destroyed in the war that ensued.

Eris is also mentioned in Nonnus's Dionysiaca, when Typhon prepares to battle with Zeus:

Eris ("Strife") was Typhon's escort in the mellay, Nike ("Victory") led Zeus into battle.

Another story of Eris includes Hera, and the love of Polytechnus and Aedon. They claimed to love each other more than Hera and Zeus were in love. This angered Hera, so she sent Eris to wreak discord upon them. Polytekhnos was finishing off a chariot board, and Aedon a web she had been weaving. Eris said to them, "Whosoever finishes thine task last shall have to present the other with a female servant!" Aedon won. But Polytekhnos was not happy by his defeat, so he came to Khelidon, Aedon's sister, and raped her. He then disguised her as a slave, presenting her to Aedon. When Aedon discovered this was indeed her sister, she chopped up Polytekhnos's son and fed him to Polytekhnos. The gods were not pleased, so they turned them all into birds.

Cultural influences

Discordianism

Eris has been adopted as the patron deity of the modern Discordian religion, which was begun in the late 1950s by Gregory Hill and Kerry Wendell Thornley under the pen names of "Malaclypse the Younger" and "Omar Khayyam Ravenhurst". The Discordian version of Eris is considerably lighter in comparison to the rather malevolent Graeco-Roman original, wherein she is depicted as a positive (albeit mischievous) force of chaotic creation. Principia Discordia, the first holy book of Discordianism, states:

The story of Eris being snubbed and indirectly starting the Trojan War is recorded in the Principia, and is referred to as the Original Snub. The Principia Discordia states that her parents may be as described in Greek legend, or that she may be the daughter of Void. She is the Goddess of Disorder and Being, whereas her sister Aneris (called the equivalent of Harmonia by the Mythics of Harmonia) is the goddess of Order and Non-Being. Their brother is Spirituality.

Discordian Eris is looked upon as a foil to the preoccupation of western philosophy in attempting find order in the chaos of reality, in prescribing order to be synonymous with truth. Discordian Eris teaches us that the only truth is chaos, and that order and disorder are simply temporary filters applied to the lenses we view the chaos through. This is known as the Aneristic Illusion.

In this telling, Eris becomes something of a patron saint of chaotic creation:

The concept of Eris as developed by the Principia Discordia is used and expanded upon in the science fiction work The Illuminatus! Trilogy by Robert Shea and Robert Anton Wilson (in which characters from Principia Discordia appear). In this work, Eris is a major character.

Other
The classic fairy tale "Sleeping Beauty" is partly inspired by Eris's role in the wedding of Peleus and Thetis. Like Eris, a malevolent fairy curses a princess after not being invited to the princess's christening.

The New Zealand moth species Ichneutica eris was named in honour of Eris.

See also

 Aneris
 Eristic

Notes

References 
 Caldwell, Richard (June 1, 1987). Hesiod's Theogony. Focus Publishing/R. Pullins Company. .
 Hesiod, Theogony, in The Homeric Hymns and Homerica with an English Translation by Hugh G. Evelyn-White, Cambridge, Massachusetts, Harvard University Press; London, William Heinemann Ltd., 1914. Online version at the Perseus Digital Library.
 Homer, The Iliad with an English Translation by A.T. Murray, Ph.D. in two volumes. Cambridge, Massachusetts, Harvard University Press; London, William Heinemann, Ltd. 1924. Online version at the Perseus Digital Library.
 Nonnus, Dionysiaca, Volume I: Books 1–15, translated by W. H. D. Rouse, Loeb Classical Library No. 344, Cambridge, Massachusetts, Harvard University Press, 1940 (revised 1984). . Online version at Harvard University Press. Internet Archive (1940).
 Parada, Carlos, Genealogical Guide to Greek Mythology, Jonsered, Paul Åströms Förlag, 1993. .

External links

Hesiod's Works and Days
Hesiod's Theogony
Homer's Iliad
Homer's Iliad at Gutenberg (there are many different translations at Gutenberg)

 
Deeds of Ares
Chaos gods
Children of Hera
Children of Zeus
Deities in the Iliad
Discordianism
Eris (dwarf planet)
Greek goddesses
Greek trickster deities
Greek war deities
New religious movement deities
Personifications in Greek mythology
Trickster goddesses
War goddesses
Women of Ares
Children of Nyx